Richard Brown is an American attorney and politician currently serving as State Representative for the 5th district of the Ohio House of Representatives.

Ohio House of Representatives

Appointment and reelection
When former Rep. Heather Bishoff left the General Assembly in the summer of 2017, Brown opted to seek the appointment to replace her. Bishoff resigned from the 20th House District abruptly in April of that year, saying she planned to move to California to focus on the financial services business she started with her husband.

Brown was among nine candidates eventually interviewed to replace her by House Democrats, who had the authority to appoint a replacement. Ultimately, he was selected, and seated on June 28, 2017. On November 6, 2018, Brown was reelected to a full two-year term, winning 59% of the vote over Republican candidate Bobby Mitchell.

Committees
Brown serves on the following committees: Armed Services and Criminal Justice, Civil Justice, and Insurance.

Election history

References

External links
Ohio State Representative Richard M. Brown official site

Living people
University of Cincinnati alumni
Democratic Party members of the Ohio House of Representatives
People from Ironton, Ohio
21st-century American politicians
People from Canal Winchester, Ohio
Year of birth missing (living people)
Ohio State University Moritz College of Law alumni